Enrico Cosenz (12 January 18207 August 1898) was an Italian soldier born at Gaeta.

As captain of artillery in the Neapolitan army, he took part in the expedition sent by Ferdinand II against the Austrians in 1848; but after the coup d'etat at Naples, he followed General Guglielmo Pepe in disobeying Ferdinand's order for the withdrawal of the troops, and proceeded to Venice to aid in defending that city. As commandant of the fort of Marghera, Cosenz displayed distinguished valor, and after the fall of the fort assumed the defence of the Piazzale, where he was twice wounded.

Upon the fall of Venice he fled to Corfu and in France. In 1859, in the wake of the Second Independence War, Cosenz went to Piedmont, where he assumed the command of a Hunters of the Alps (Cacciatori delle Alpi) regiment, fighting in the Battle of Varese.

He entered in the Sardinian army, only to exit in order to participate in the Spedizione dei Mille (Expedition of the Thousand), led by Garibaldi, that  ultimately freed Sicily from Bourbon rule. In 1860 he conducted the third Garibaldian expedition to Sicily, defeated two Neapolitan brigades at Piale (August 23), and marched victoriously upon Naples, where he was appointed minister of war, and took part in organizing the plebiscite. He then rejoined the Italian Army with the rank of Lieutenant general; during the war of 1866 he was given command of a division, which however saw little combat.

After the war he repeatedly declined the portfolio of war. In 1882 he became the first Chief of Staff of the Regio Esercito, and held that position until 1893. He died at Rome in 1898, aged 78.

References

External links
 Generali ufficiali garibaldini 

1820 births
1898 deaths
People from Gaeta
Italian soldiers
Italian people of the Italian unification
Members of the Expedition of the Thousand
People of the First Italian War of Independence
People of the Second Italian War of Independence
People of the Third Italian War of Independence
Commanders Grand Cross of the Order of the Sword